Beaner Lake is a lake in Okanogan County, Washington, in the United States.

The name of the lake has been criticized in the media for containing the ethnic slur beaner.

See also
List of lakes in Washington

References

Lakes of Okanogan County, Washington
Lakes of Washington (state)